The Robert Award for Best Actress in a Leading Television Role is one of the merit awards presented by the Danish Film Academy at the annual Robert Awards ceremony. The award has been handed out since 2013.

Honorees

2010s 
 2013: Sofie Gråbøl – Forbrydelsen 3
 2014: Sofia Helin – Broen II
 2015: Trine Dyrholm – The Legacy

References

External links 
  

2013 establishments in Denmark
Awards established in 2013
Actress in a Leading Television Role
Television awards for Best Actress